Michael Andrew (born 27 September 1943) is a former Malaysian cyclist. He competed in the individual road race at the 1964 Summer Olympics.

References

External links
 

1943 births
Living people
Malaysian male cyclists
Olympic cyclists of Malaysia
Cyclists at the 1964 Summer Olympics
Place of birth missing (living people)